The Nakajima C6N Saiunn (彩雲, "Iridescent Cloud") was a carrier-based reconnaissance aircraft used by the Imperial Japanese Navy Air Service in World War II. Advanced for its time, it was the fastest carrier-based aircraft put into service by Japan during the war. The Allied reporting name was Myrt.

Development and design
The C6N originated from a 1942 Imperial Japanese Navy specification for a carrier-based reconnaissance plane with a top speed of 350 knots (650 km/h) at 6,000 m and range of 2,500 nautical miles (4,960 km). Nakajima's initial proposal, designated N-50, was for a craft with two  engines housed in tandem in the fuselage, driving two propellers mounted on the wings. With the development of the  class Nakajima Homare engine, the dual powerplant configuration was abandoned and Nakajima decided on a more conventional single-engine layout. Unfortunately the new Homare's power output was less than expected, and the design had to be optimized in other areas. The resulting aircraft was designed around a long and extremely narrow cylindrical fuselage just large enough in diameter to accommodate the engine. The crew of three sat in tandem under a single canopy, while equipment was similarly arranged in a line along the fuselage. The C6N's low-mounted laminar flow wing housed fuel tanks and was fitted with both Fowler and slit flaps and leading-edge slats which lowered the aircraft's landing speed to ease use aboard aircraft carriers. Like Nakajima's earlier B6N Tenzan torpedo bomber, the vertical stabilizer was angled slightly forward to enable tighter packing on aircraft carrier decks.

Performance of the Homare engine was disappointing, especially its power at altitude, and a series of 18 further prototypes and pre-production aircraft were built before the Saiun was finally ordered into production in February 1944.

Operational history
Although designed for carrier use, by the time it entered service in September 1944 there were few carriers left for it to operate from, so most C6Ns were flown from land bases. Its speed was exemplified by a telegraph sent after a successful mission: "No Grummans can catch us." ("我に追いつくグラマンなし"). The top speed of the Hellcat was indeed of the same level, so overtaking a Saiun was out of the question.

A total of 463 aircraft were produced. A single prototype of a turbocharged development mounting a 4-blade propeller was built; this was called the C6N2 Saiun-kai. Several examples of a night fighter version C6N1-S with oblique-firing (Schräge Musik configuration) single 30 mm (or dual 20 mm) cannon were converted from existing C6N1s. As Allied bombers came within reach of the Japanese home islands, a first class night fighter was required. This led Nakajima to develop the C6N1-S by removing the observer and replacing him with two 20 mm cannons. The C6N1-S's effectiveness was hampered by the lack of air-to-air radar, although it was fast enough to enjoy almost complete immunity from interception by Allied fighters. A torpedo carrying C6N1-B was also proposed, but was not needed after most of Japan's aircraft carriers were destroyed.

Despite its speed and performance, on 15 August 1945 a C6N1 happened to be the last aircraft to be shot down in World War II. Just five minutes later, the war was over and all Japanese aircraft were grounded.

Variants

Source:Famous Airplanes of the World
C6N1 Experimental Type 17 carrier reconnaissance plane (17試艦上偵察機, 17-Shi Kanjō Teisatsuki)
Three prototypes and sixteen supplementary prototypes produced, four-blade propeller; latter batch were equipped three-blade propeller, mounted Nakajima NK9K-L Homare 22 engine, No. 6 was mounted Nakajima NK9H Homare 21 engine. Renamed Test production Saiun (試製彩雲, Shisei Saiun) in July 1943.
C6N1 Saiun Model 11 (彩雲11型, Saiun 11-gata)
General production model. Three-blade propeller, mounted Nakajima NK9H Homare 21 engine.
C6N1-B Saiun Model 21 (彩雲21型, Saiun 21-gata)
Proposed torpedo bomber version. Only a project.
C6N1 Saiun Model 11 night fighter variant (彩雲11型改造夜戦, Saiun 11-gata Kaizō yasen)
Temporary rebuilt two-seat night fighter version; this was not a regulation naval aircraft. Development code C6N1-S was not discovered in the IJN official documents. One model with a singular 30 mm Type 5 cannon and at least five models with ×2 20 mm Type 99-1 cannon were converted from standard C6N1 models. One surviving example of the ×2 20mm cannon variant is stored in the Paul E. Garber Preservation, Restoration, and Storage Facility.
C6N2 Test production Saiun Kai/Saiun Model 12 (試製彩雲改/彩雲12型, Shisei Saiun Kai/Saiun 12-gata)
Fitted with four-blade propeller, 1,980-hp (1,476-kW) Nakajima NK9K-L Homare 24-Ru turbocharged engine. Two prototypes were converted from regular C6N1 models in February 1945.
C6N3 Test production Saiun Kai 1 (試製彩雲改1, Shisei Saiun Kai 1)
Proposed high-altitude night fighter version of the C6N2. Dual 20 mm cannons were installed. Only a project.
C6N4 Test production Saiun Kai 2 (試製彩雲改2, Shisei Saiun Kai 2)
Fitted 2,200-hp Mitsubishi MK9A Ha 43-11 Ru turbocharged engine, one prototype was converted from C6N1, incomplete.
C6N5 Test production Saiun Kai 3 (試製彩雲改3, Shisei Saiun Kai 3)
Proposed torpedo bomber version. Only a project.
C6N6 Test production Saiun Kai 4 (試製彩雲改4, Shisei Saiun Kai 4)
Wooden aircraft model. Only a project.

Operators

Imperial Japanese Navy Air Service

Naval Air Group
Yokosuka Kōkūtai
121st Kōkūtai
131st Kōkūtai
132nd Kōkūtai
141st Kōkūtai
171st Kōkūtai
210th Kōkūtai
302nd Kōkūtai
343rd Kōkūtai
701st Kōkūtai
723rd Kōkūtai
752nd Kōkūtai
762nd Kōkūtai
801st Kōkūtai
1001st Kōkūtai
Aerial Squadron
Reconnaissance 3rd Hikōtai
Reconnaissance 4th Hikōtai
Reconnaissance 11th Hikōtai
Reconnaissance 12th Hikōtai
Reconnaissance 102nd Hikōtai
Kamikaze
1st Mitate Special Attack Group (picked from 752nd Kōkūtai)
Sairyū Unit (picked from 752nd Kōkūtai, no sorties)
Saiun Unit (picked from 723rd Kōkūtai, no sorties)

Specifications (C6N1)

See also

Notes

Bibliography
 Francillon, René J. Japanese Aircraft of the Pacific War. London: Putnam & Company Ltd., 1970.  (2nd edition 1979).
 Francillon, René J. Japanese Carrier Air Groups, 1941–45. London; Osprey Publishing Ltd., 1979. .

 Mondey, David. The Concise Guide to Axis Aircraft of World War II. London: Chancellor Press, 1996. .

Further reading
Famous Airplanes of the World No. 108 Carrier Reconnaissance Plane "Saiun", Bunrindō (Japan), 2005. .
The Maru Mechanic No. 15 Nakajima C6N1 Carrier Based Rec. Saiun, Ushio Shobō (Japan), 1979.
Model Art, No. 458, Special issue Imperial Japanese Navy Air Force Suicide Attack Unit "Kamikaze", Model Art Co. Ltd. (Japan) 1995.
Kazuhiko Osuo, Kamikaze, Kōjinsha (Japan), 2005. . (This book is same as Model Art No. 458.)

External links

 

Low-wing aircraft
Carrier-based aircraft
C6N, Nakajima
World War II Japanese reconnaissance aircraft
Single-engined tractor aircraft
Aircraft first flown in 1943